1990 ACC tournament may refer to:

 1990 ACC men's basketball tournament
 1990 ACC women's basketball tournament
 1990 ACC men's soccer tournament
 1990 ACC women's soccer tournament
 1990 Atlantic Coast Conference baseball tournament